Carroll F. King (February 17, 1924 – January 28, 2010) was an American businessman and politician.

King lived in Denham, Pine County, Minnesota with his wife and family. He served in the United States Air Force during World War II and a pilot and navigator. King graduated from University of Wisconsin and was the manager of the Denham Cooperative Association. He served in the Minnesota House of Representatives in 1957 and 1958. King then moved to Ulster Park, Ulster County, New York.

References

1924 births
2010 deaths
People from Pine County, Minnesota
People from Ulster County, New York
University of Wisconsin alumni
Businesspeople from Minnesota
Military personnel from Minnesota
Members of the Minnesota House of Representatives